Old Town ward is a ward in the metropolitan borough of Barnsley, South Yorkshire, England.  The ward contains three listed buildings that are recorded in the National Heritage List for England.  All the listed buildings are designated at Grade II, the lowest of the three grades, which is applied to "buildings of national importance and special interest".  The ward is to the northwest of the centre of the town of Barnsley.  The listed buildings all date from the 20th century, and consist of a large house later used for other purposes, a former school, and a church.


Buildings

See also 

 Listed buildings in Barnsley

References

Citations

Sources

 

Lists of listed buildings in South Yorkshire
Listed